WILS (1320 AM) is a commercial news/talk radio station in Lansing, Michigan.  WILS is owned by MacDonald Broadcasting and features a local news department and a mixture of local and national talk personalities.

WILS is powered at 25,000 watts by day.  But to protect other stations on AM 1320, it reduces power to 1,900 watts at night.  It uses a directional antenna day and night.  The transmitter is located off North Green Road in Dimondale.

Programming
WILS is home to the locally produced "Morning Wakeup with Dave Akerly."  It is heard weekdays, focusing on local issues and personalities, including politics and business.  Akerly is a former Lansing TV news host.  Syndicated talk shows round out the rest of the weekday schedule:  Glenn Beck, Sean Hannity, Jim Bohannon, Lars Larson, Dennis Prager, Coast to Coast AM and First Light.  Weekends include shows on money, health, real estate and technology.  Syndicated shows from Kim Komando, Clark Howard and Leo Laporte are heard. Some weekend hours are paid brokered programming.  Most hours begin with world and national news from Fox News Radio.

WILS's talk radio rival is Townsquare Media's (formerly Cumulus Media) WJIM AM 1240, also licensed to Lansing.  WJIM was WILS's main competitor when both were Top 40 stations in the 1960s and 70s. In 2013, WJIM dropped Sean Hannity and Glenn Beck, with both shows now on the WILS schedule.

History
WILS signed on February 19, 1947, as a daytimer at 1430 kHz with 500 watts of power, and required to go off the air at night. The transmitter for the station was located on East Mount Hope avenue, with studios located in downtown Lansing at Saginaw and North Washington.

In March 1950, the station moved to 1320 kHz and increased power to 1,000 watts with a directional antenna array located at 600 W. Cavanaugh Road. In 1952, the Federal Communications Commission granted WILS to up its power once again to 5,000 daytime and 1,000 watts nighttime using separate directional arrays. In 1966, the studios were moved from downtown to the Cavanaugh Road site, where they remain today.

The Lansing Broadcasting Company, original owners of WILS, made two attempts to enter the world of television. The first was an unsuccessful UHF station, WILS-TV, which began broadcasts in 1953; a year later, the company leased it to another group, under which it operated as WTOM-TV until its 1956 demise. By that time, WILS was chasing a VHF allotment to Parma and Onondaga, proposing to share time with a station to be run by Michigan State University. WILS's second and more successful station, WILX-TV channel 10, went on the air March 15, 1959; it was owned by Jackson Telecasters, a company in which Lansing Broadcasting owned a 50 percent stake, along with WJCO radio (AM 1510, now WJKN).

WILS was a popular Top 40 music station in Lansing during the 1960s and 1970s. One popular WILS personality during the '60s Top 40 era was John Records Landecker, who later went on to great popularity at WLS in Chicago, WPHR in Cleveland, and CFTR in Toronto. Timmy O' Toole, another popular Chicago radio personality worked at WILS from 1969 to 1971 before he joins WLUP in 1977. He currently does Weekends on True Oldies 94.7 in Chicago. WILS was a fully staffed live radio station until January 17, 1984, when the station switched to mostly automation (the original automated format was Drake-Chenault's "Hitparade", a Big Band/Nostalgia format) and was known as Hometown Radio 1320.

The WILS call sign was also shared with a sister station at 101.7 FM (now WHZZ). From 1967 to 1972, the WILS-AM-FM simulcast the top-40 format. In 1972, WILS-FM launched a country music format.  However Jerry Marshall's morning show which originated on WILS-AM continued to be heard on the FM as well. Then three years later in 1975, WILS-FM returned to a twelve hour simulcast of the AM station in the daytime, followed by 6 hours of progressive rock in the evenings and jazz overnight. The rock format was so popular that WILS-FM completely broke away from the AM station in 1978. The station was dubbed Rockradio WILS 101 FM.  WILS-AM/FM were purchased by Sentry Broadcasting, a subsidiary of the Sentry Insurance Company, in August 1983, signaling format changes for both stations.  WILS-AM abandoned its live full-service Adult Contemporary format in favor of Drake-Chenault's "Hitparade" Big Band/Nostalgia format in January 1984 (with the Larry King Show continuing to air overnight).  WILS-FM dropped its Album Rock format as 101-ILS in April 1984, switching to a Soft Adult Contemporary format branded as Love Songs LS-102.  The Hitparade format on WILS-AM was dropped in the fall of 1984 with the switch to Drake Chenault's "Lite Hits" automation format, closely matching the format of WILS-FM.  Morning drive and weekend dayparts were simulcast with live personalities on the FM side.   (See WHZZ for further history on the former WILS-FM 101.7.)

Sentry Insurance made the decision to divest their radio properties in 1986, leading to the sale of WILS-AM/FM to Lansing-based Northstar Broadcasting in the fall of that year.  WILS-AM switched to an Urban Contemporary format in September 1987, once again utilizing a Drake-Chenault format called "Urban One", with the station branded as 1320 Jams.  Morning drive was live-hosted by local air personality Michael McFadden, who also served as the station's program director.  WILS-AM became the first 24-hour Urban Contemporary station in the Lansing market as then-competitor WXLA 1180 was limited to daytime-only operation.  The Urban format proved to be a success and continued until 1992, shortly after WXLA launched a sister FM station WQHH 96.5 with a competing Urban Contemporary format.  WQHH proved to be a significant competitor with its FM stereo signal, leading to the eventual end of the Urban format on WILS-AM (WXLA and WQHH would later become sister stations of WILS under MacDonald Broadcasting ownership).

WILS was purchased by MacDonald Broadcasting, owner of several other stations in the Saginaw and Traverse City markets. The station switched briefly to a country music format (simulcast with WILS-FM) in 1992, and then flipped to Adult Standards in 1993. It was known as Unforgettable 1320 and was an affiliate of ABC Radio's satellite-delivered adult standards/MOR music package known as "Timeless Classics" (formerly "Stardust"). The station had had this format since the early 1990s and was quite successful in the ratings with it. The Timeless Favorites format moved to sister WXLA 1180 AM after that station was purchased by MacDonald Broadcasting; WILS and WXLA essentially simulcast each other with separate IDs and imaging until 2006. 1320 WILS changed its format to news and talk radio, with the slogan More Stimulating Talk Radio airing personalities such as Laura Ingram, Clark Howard, Dennis Miller, and Michael Savage. Local personalities included then morning show host Walt Sorg, followed by Chris Holman, Tony Conley and since 2015 former WLNS-TV primary news anchor Dave Akerly with his Morning Wake Up, weekdays 6-9 a.m. Sports talk show host Jack Ebling was an afternoon fixture on WILS before moving to WQTX. In 2010, the station changed its slogan to the current More Compelling Talk Radio moniker.

On January 25, 2008, WILS turned on their new Windsor Township transmitter and became the most powerful AM station in Lansing.  The new 25 kW daytime signal covers much of Mid-Michigan, and be easily received as far away as Grand Rapids, Kalamazoo, Mt. Pleasant, and Jackson. The station can even be heard in portions of northern Ohio and Indiana. The directional pattern of WILS is limited to the east to avoid adjacent channel interference with WTRX 1330 in Flint. The new 1.9 kW four tower nighttime array provides better coverage to the immediate Lansing, Charlotte, Grand Ledge, and DeWitt areas.

References

External links

Michiguide.com - WILS History
1320-WILS-AM - More Compelling Talk Radio - Live and Lansing
FCC History Cards for WILS

ILS
Radio stations established in 1947
1947 establishments in Michigan